Nepal Infrastructure Bank Limited (NIFRA) is a bank established to accelerate the development of infrastructures of the country by investing in sustainable infrastructure and other productive sectors. In the financial year 2077-78, the bank earned NPR 83.64 crore in profit.

Share Holding Partnership
Nepal Government: 10%
Private Investors: 10%
Public Companies: 40%
General Public: 40%
Public Shares: Can be traded in NEPSE

References

Banks of Nepal